Christian Landu-Tubi (born 28 June 1984 in Kinshasa) is a DR Congolese international footballer.

References

External links 
 Football-LineUps Profile
 Footgoal Profile

1984 births
Living people
Footballers from Kinshasa
Democratic Republic of the Congo footballers
Standard Liège players
R.W.D.M. Brussels F.C. players
Tennis Borussia Berlin players
C.S. Visé players
Democratic Republic of the Congo expatriate footballers
Democratic Republic of the Congo expatriate sportspeople in Belgium
Democratic Republic of the Congo expatriate sportspeople in Germany
Association football forwards
21st-century Democratic Republic of the Congo people